Kelatha Wildlife Sanctuary (alternatively spelt as Kaylartha Widlife Sanctuary) is a protected area in Myanmar stretching over . It was established in 1942. The sanctuary is administered from Bilin.

Location
The sanctuary is located on the western side of the Railway line linking  Taung Sun and Kyaik Hto railway stations. There are roads all along the boundary of the sanctuary. The topography of the sanctuary is mostly flat with few undulating hills.

Description
The sanctuary receives south-west Monsoon rains every year. The sanctuary receives heavy rainfall in June, July and August every year. 

The Shwe Parami Forest Monastery and the Kaylartha Pagoda is a famous pilgrimage site on the hillock inside the sanctuary. The seaside view from the mountain has made it a major tourism destination.

In 2016, a rock and quarry project aimed at producing rock suitable for road paving was suspended on Kaylatha Mountain after inspection from the Ministry of Natural Resources and Environmental Conservation. The minister, Ohn Win, placed a temporary ban on mining within the sanctuary. Eventually, quarry projects were permitted to operate only along the boundaries area as they had historically been quarry sites.

Biodiversity

The prevailing forest type in Kelatha Wildlife Sanctuary is mixed deciduous forest and evergreen forest. Teak (Tectona grandis), Antiaris toxicaria, Mesua ferrea, Pygeum anomalum, Ficus oligodon, Diospyros discolor, Baccaurea flaccida, Dipterocarpus alatus are the important tree species. Amherstia nobilis is endemic to Myanmar.

In 1996, Sambar deer (Rusa unicolor), wild boar  (Sus scrofa), serow and barking deer species were reported to occur in Kelatha Wildlife Sanctuary. Its fauna comprises 69 bird species, 17 mammals, 71 butterfly species, 12 beetle species and 14 reptile species.

References

Protected areas of Myanmar
Protected areas established in 1942